Tanzania is represented at the 2006 Commonwealth Games in Melbourne by a xx-member strong contingent comprising xx sportspersons and xx officials. The squad ended up in 19th place in the overall medal count, with one gold and one bronze.

Medals

Gold
Samson Ramadhani — Athletics, Men's Marathon

Bronze
Fabiano Joseph Naasi — Athletics, Men's 10,000 metres

See also
Tanzania at the 2004 Summer Olympics
Tanzania at the 2008 Summer Olympics

References
Commonwealth Games Federation

Tanzania at the Commonwealth Games
Nations at the 2006 Commonwealth Games
Commonwealth Games